Sailing/Yachting is an Olympic sport starting from the Games of the 1st Olympiad (1896 Olympics in Athens, Greece). With the exception of 1904 and the canceled 1916 Summer Olympics, sailing has always been included on the Olympic schedule. The Sailing program of 1928 consisted of a total of three sailing classes. For each class races were scheduled from 2–9 August 1928 on the Buiten Y near Amsterdam and on the Zuiderzee. The sailing was done on the triangular type Olympic courses.

Venue 
Source:

Six Harbor 
As venue for the Amsterdam Olympics the Zuiderzee near Amsterdam was chosen. The organizing committee of the sailing event was the Koninklijk Verbond Nederlandsche Watersport Vereniging. The Olympic harbor Six Harbor was on the North shore of the Y just opposite of the Amsterdam Centraal railway station. The boats were moored in the so-called 'kinderkamer' of the harbor. The Six Harbor was in that time the location of the Koninklijke Nederlandsche Zeil- & Roeivereeniging. This resulted that all competing yachts had to go through the Oranje Locks to enter the Buiten Y and Zuiderzee. Some of the former buildings of the Six Harbor were demolished during the construction of the Amsterdam Metro North–south line.

Course areas 
A total of two race areas were used for sailing at the Amsterdam Olympics:
 The courses of the 12' Dinghy were just outside the locks on the buiten Y in front of Durgerdam.
 For the 6 and 8 Metre the used courses were about 5 nm out of the locks, East of the Isle of Marken on the Zuiderzee.

At that time the Zuiderzee had an open connection with the North Sea. The sea water was salt or at best brackish. Waves could be steep and short due to the shallow waters.

In 1932 a dam was built between the North Sea and the Zuiderzee and the Zuiderzee was renamed IJsselmeer. As result of this the lake now contains fresh water. Inside the lake new land was reclaimed. At this moment the center of the 1928 6 and 8 Metre course is located in the city of Almere. Also the city of Amsterdam reclaimed land from the sea and moved towards the lake. When the sailors from the 1928 Summer Olympics could return to their venue they would hardly recognize it.

Competition 
Source:

Overview

Continents

Countries

Classes (equipment)

Race schedule
Source:

Medal summary 
Source:

Medal table 
Source:

Notes

Quality of racing 
This Olympic sailing regatta can be considered as the first Olympic regatta with a high quality of racing since there were:
 Well selected classes that represented sailing
 Sufficient competitors per class
 Good and fair sailing conditions

Amateurism as defined by the National Authority in The Netherlands

Other information

Sailing 
During the sailing regattas at the 1928 Summer Olympics among others the following persons were competing in the various classes:
 , Crown Prince of Norway, Crown Prince Olav in the 6 Metre
 , First full-time yachtwoman, Virginie Hériot in the 8 Metre
 , United States yachting legend and inventor of the Swimfin, Owen Churchill in the 8 Metre
 , Owner of Wilh. Wilhelmsen, Norway, Wilhelm Wilhelmsen Jr. in the 8 Metre
 , Yacht designer and boat builder, Netherlands, Willem de Vries Lentsch in the 12' Dinghy

Further reading

References 

 
1928 Summer Olympics events
1928
1928 in sailing
Sailing competitions in the Netherlands